Chapin Field  is a privately owned, public use airport in Washington County, New York, United States. It is located two nautical miles (4 km) north of the central business district of Cambridge, a village in the Town of Cambridge.

Facilities and aircraft 
Chapin Field covers an area of 14 acres (6 ha) at an elevation of 508 feet (155 m) above mean sea level. It has two runways with turf surfaces: 5/23 is 2,130 by 65 feet (649 x 20 m) and 7/25 is 2,100 by 63 feet (640 x 19 m).

For the 12-month period ending August 2, 2012, the airport had 1,400 aircraft operations, an average of 116 per month: 93% general aviation and 7% military. At that time there were 21 aircraft based at this airport: 95% single-engine and 5% multi-engine.

References

External links 
 Aerial image as of May 1994 from USGS The National Map
 

Airports in New York (state)
Transportation buildings and structures in Washington County, New York